Port Honduras Marine Reserve is a national protected marine reserve in the Toledo district of Belize. It encompasses over one hundred small, mangrove-fringed cayes, benthic habitats comprising soft-bottom seagrass beds and fringing reefs.

The reserve is co-managemened by the community-based Non Governmental Organization the Toledo Institute for Development and Environment. It is divided into three zones: a general use zone, a preservation zone and a conservation zone.

References

Nature conservation in Belize
Marine reserves
Protected areas of Belize
Protected areas established in 2000
Mesoamerican Barrier Reef System
Toledo District
2000 establishments in Belize